The 2015–16 HockeyAllsvenskan season was the 11th season since the second tier of ice hockey in Sweden was renamed. The league features 14 teams, each playing each other four times, for a total of 52 regular season games. The season began on 11 September 2015 and the regular season ended on 28 February 2016, followed by promotion and relegation tournaments until 2 April.

Participating teams

Regular season

Standings

Post-season

Finals
In the HockeyAllsvenskan finals, the first and second place teams from the regular season will meet in a best-of-five series, where the winner will advance to the SHL qualifiers, and the losing team will continue to a playoff to the SHL qualifiers. The matches were held on 1 March, 3 March, 5 March, and then 7 March and 9 March.

AIK vs. Tingsryd AIF

HockeyAllsvenskan playoffs
In the HockeyAllsvenskan playoffs, teams 3–8 meet in a single-round robin tournament. Teams 3–5 will have an extra game on home-ice. The matches will be held on 2–10 March. Teams will also start with bonus points based on their position in the regular season standings. Team 3 will begin with three points, team 4 with two points, and team 5 with one point.

The winner of the group advances to the playoff to the SHL qualifiers.

Playoff to the SHL qualifiers
In the playoff to the SHL qualifiers, the losing team from the HockeyAllsvenskan finals meets the winning team from the HockeyAllsvenskan playoffs in a best-of-three series that were played 12 March and 15 March. The winning team advances to the SHL qualifiers.

Tingsryd AIF vs. Leksands IF

SHL qualifiers
In the SHL qualifiers, the winners of the HockeyAllsvenskan finals and the playoff to the SHL qualifiers are paired against teams 13 and 14 from the 2015–16 SHL season. Each pair plays a best-of-seven series, with the winner qualifying for play in the 2016–17 SHL season, and the loser playing in the 2016–17 HockeyAllsvenskan season. These series began on 19 and 20 March, and will be completed by 1 April at the latest. Karlskrona HK was the first team to win their series, 4 games to 1, to qualify for their second season in the SHL. Leksands IF would then win their series, 4 games to 3, to get promoted to the SHL.

Karlskrona HK vs. AIK

Modo Hockey vs. Leksands IF

HockeyAllsvenskan qualifiers
Asplöven and Sundsvall, teams 13 and 14 from the regular season, will be forced to defend their spots in HockeyAllsvenskan in the HockeyAllsvenskan qualifiers. Joining the two HockeyAllsvenskan teams will be four challengers from third-tier league Hockeyettan, the winner of AllEttan North (Borlänge HF), the winner of AllEttan South (Västerviks IK), and the two surviving teams from the Hockeyettan playoffs (IF Troja/Ljungby and Södertälje SK).

These six teams will play a double round robin tournament from 10 March to 2 April. Teams 1 and 2 from this tournament are qualified for the 2016–17 HockeyAllsvenskan season, while teams 3–6 will play in the 2016–17 Hockeyettan season.

References

2015-16 HockeyAllsvenskan season
2015–16 in European second tier ice hockey leagues
2015–16 in Swedish ice hockey leagues